Andrew Dunn may refer to:

 Andrew Dunn (actor) (born 1957), English actor
 Andrew Dunn (businessman) (1854–1934), Australian newspaper proprietor and Member of the Queensland Legislative Council
 Andrew Dunn (cinematographer), British cinematographer
 Andrew Dunn (horticulturalist) (born 1917), 2003 Victoria Medal of Honour winner
 Andrew Hunter Dunn (1839–1914), bishop of Quebec
 Andy Dunn (born 1979), American entrepreneur

See also
 Andrew Dunne (born 1979), Irish rugby union player
 Andrew Dunne (priest) (died 1823), Irish priest